Rex Vijayan (born 26 April 1983) is an Indian composer, guitarist, singer, record producer and multi-instrumentalist from Kerala. He is best known for being co-founder and guitarist for the alternative Malayali rock band Avial. He started out his career as a composer in the Malayalam film industry through Kerala Cafe by giving the score to Anwar Rasheed's segment 'Bridge'.

Early life
He is the son of Albert Vijayan, a music director in Malayalam films. He self-learnt to play various instruments at a very young age and began his musical career by mastering cover versions. He married Chintu Ramesh on 14 March 2008 at Kollam. His brother Jackson Vijayan is also a musician.

Motherjane
Vijayan was part of the popular Kochi based rock band Motherjane, as the rhythm guitarist from 2000 to 2003. Even though he left the band in 2003, He continued to associate with Motherjane as a consultant. He was the producer of the band's singles Jihad(2010), Clayplay(2015) and Namaste(2018).

Avial
He is the music composer, lead guitarist and synthesizer of the Trivandrum-based Malayalam alternative rock band "Avial" since 2003.

Other collaborations
He was part of an amateur German hip-hop band "Intensive Erfrischung" (Intensive Refreshment), which was based in Munich. He is also actively involved with Daksha Seth's Dance Company, which is concerned with performing on stage contemporary dance. Gibson Guitar Corporation, USA offered him to be their endorsee for their latest high end series guitar "Gibson Les Paul Classic".. He has also produced and composed music for some ad-films with Papaya Media, Kerala Tourism Dept. etc.

Film composing
Rex debuted into film music direction with Anwar Rasheed's 'Bridge', a segment of the portmanteau film Kerala Cafe. He then did the composing of Chaappa Kurishu directed by Sameer Thahir, 22 Female Kottayam, by Aashiq Abu, helped with the background score of films Second Show and Friday and did music for Shyamaprasad's movie English in which he collaborated with American clarinet player and music composer Shankar Tucker in the song Aakashame featuring Rohan Kymal on vocals. He then did the title track for Anil Radhakrishnan Menon's debut movie North 24 Kaatham starring Fahadh Faasil. Rex Vijayan become a playback singer with ‘Enthanu Bhai' in Aashiq Abu's film Da Thadiya. His work for Sameer Thahir's second movie Neelakasham Pachakadal Chuvanna Bhoomi (after his directorial debut 'Chaappa Kurishu') has set a path breaking trend in malayalam film music. Rex has also sung the title track 'Neelakasham' for the movie.

Sapthamashree Thaskaraha was Rex's next film, in which he composed songs such as Thaane Pookum and Nam Onnaayi. After that Rex went on to do the background score for Picket 43. He returned after a break with Parava in 2017. Later in the year he composed music for Aashiq Abu's Mayaanadhi. Rex's composition for the film was well appreciated. The song Mizhiyil Ninnum was a sensational hit and singer Shahabaz Aman won the Kerala State Film Award for Best Singer for the rendition. His latest releases as music composer are Sudani from Nigeria(2018), Thamaasha(2019) and Valiyaperunnal(2019), all were widely acclaimed. He also served as music producer for the 2020 movie Halal Love Story.

Discography

Original soundtracks

As playback singer

Awards

References

External links
 Rex Vijayan on IMDb

Indian guitarists
Living people
1983 births
21st-century guitarists